The 1st Corps is a corps of the Syrian Army that was first formed in the 1980s.

Richard Bennett wrote in 2001 that "three corps [were] formed in 1985 to give the Army more flexibility and to improve combat efficiency by decentralising the command structure, absorbing at least some of the lessons learned during the Israeli invasion of the Lebanon in 1982." He said that the 1st Corps covered southern Syria, in particular the heavily fortified defense zone between Damascus and the Golan Heights and south to Daraa near the border with Jordan.

Bennett's estimate of the 2001 order of battle was:
1st Corps, HQ Damascus
5th Armoured Division, which included the 17th and 96th Armoured Brigades and the 112th Mechanised Brigade
6th Armoured Division, with the 12th and 98th Armoured Brigades and the 11th Mechanised Brigades
7th Mechanised Division, with the 58th and 68th Armoured Brigades and the 78th Mechanised Brigade
8th Armoured Division, which included the 62nd and 65th Armoured Brigades and the 32nd Mechanised Brigade
9th Armoured Division, with the 43rd and 91st Armoured Brigades and the 52nd Mechanised Brigade. The 52nd Armoured Brigade was reported in Daraa in May 2013.

Bennett said the 1st Corps also had four independent special forces regiments, including two trained for helicopter-inserted commando operations against the Israeli signals intelligence and observation posts on Mount Hermon and elsewhere in the Golan Heights.

Cordesman et al. said from 2002 to 2005, the command of the 1st Corps was replaced three times.

Tom Cooper wrote that prior to the Syrian Civil War, the 1st Corps' main role was defence against an Israeli invasion over the Golan Heights or through Jordan. It had two lines of defence stretching along the cease-fire lines from 1973, and controlled over four divisions (three mechanised and one armoured), a special forces division and two independent infantry brigades (seemingly the 61st and 90th).

The corps commander Major General Faraq Shehada was seized as a prisoner of war on 29 June 2012.

2013 structure
 5th Mechanized Division
 112th Mechanised Brigade - Isra
132nd and 15th Mechanised Brigades (Cooper 2015 says 132nd and 35th Mech Brigades)
 12th Armoured Brigade - Isra
 175th Artillery Regiment - Cooper 2015 says this regiment, at Isra equipped with the 2S1, was a cadre and never deployed outside its base, and then overrun in February 2014.
 7th Mechanized Division
 68th, 121st and 88 Mechanised Brigades
 78th Armoured Brigade
 (an unspecified) Artillery Regiment (nb. Cooper 2015 identified this regiment as the 85th)
 9th Armoured Division - Major General Yusuf Ahmed
 33rd, 34th and 43rd Armoured Brigades
 52nd Mechanised Brigade - disbanded circa 2011 (Cooper 2015)
 (an unspecified) Artillery Regiment (nb. Cooper 2015 identified this regiment as the 15th)

In addition, the corps still included the 61st and 90th Infantry Brigades (Independent). Within the last one/two years, Brigade 90 has been reported in the Quneitra area, but its base was reportedly overrun by rebels in February 2014.

Notes

References 

Military units and formations of Syria
Military units and formations established in 1985
Corps by country
1985 establishments in Syria